LE is a text editor which appears something like the Norton Editor, but has many additional features:
 Rectangle select/copy/paste (block type is switchable)
 Search/replace with regular expressions
 Filtering block contents through an external program
 Linear multilevel undo/redo
 Customizable menus
 Color syntax highlighting (using regular expressions in an external file)
 Handles UTF-8 characters, based on locale settings
 Customizable keymaps for different terminal types (associating either literal strings or terminfo capability names)
 Hexadecimal editing mode
 Editing of mmap'd files or devices in replace mode
 Frame drawing mode (first seen in Lexicon)
 File selection box (inspired by Turbo C)
 Built-in postfix calculator.

It uses ncurses for display, mouse and part of the keyboard handling.  The application has a built-in table of key assignments for xterm, rxvt and some less familiar terminal types.

History
According to the HISTORY file in its sources, Alexander V. Lukyanov started writing it in 1993 while using a BESTA machine. Over the next four years, he rewrote it into C++, and published it in 1997 under the GNU General Public License.

References

External links
FSF abstract for LE
GitHub

Free text editors
Software that uses ncurses
Free software programmed in C++
Software that was rewritten in C++